The 2003 Baltic Cup football competition took place from 3 to 5 July 2003 at two venues in Estonia. It was the tenth competition of the three Baltic states – Latvia, Lithuania and Estonia – since they regained their independence from the Soviet Union in 1991.

Results

Estonia vs Lithuania

Lithuania vs Latvia

Estonia vs Latvia

Final table

Winner

Statistics

Goalscorers

See also
Balkan Cup
Nordic Football Championship

References

External links
RSSSF
omnitel

Baltic Cup (football)
Baltic Cup
Baltic Cup
Baltic Cup
International association football competitions hosted by Estonia